Jacob Meyer may refer to:

 Jacob Meyer (rower) (born 1969), Danish silver medallist at the 1993 World Rowing Championships
 Jacob O. Meyer (1934–2010), founder, directing elder and spiritual leader of the Assemblies of Yahweh
 Jacob Gibble Meyer, former President of Elizabethtown College